Bryanston High School is a state-run English-medium co-educational high school in the suburb of Bryanston, Johannesburg.

Admissions
As a government fee-paying school in the province of Gauteng in the Republic of South Africa, Bryanston High School's admissions Grade 8 are administered by the Gauteng Department of Education through their online portal (https://www.gdeadmissions.gov.za/)  The school does however require additional information from prospective parents who can join the pre-admissions mailing lists (https://myschool.org.za/BryanstonHigh) 

Grade 9 to 11 admissions are managed directly by the school itself, and it is only under very rare circumstances that the school will accept pupils in their Matric year.

Admission Criteria (for Grade 8)
The GDE priorities Grade 8 admission on a number of factors ranked from high to low as follows: 

1) Home address within the school's Feeder Zone (https://myschool.org.za/BryanstonHigh/gde-feeder-area-for-bryanston-high-ver-01.jpg); 

2) Sibling currently in Grade 8 to 11; 

3) Attends one of the Feeder Schools  

4) Parent's work in the school's Feeder Zone. 

5) Live within a 30 km radius of the school; and 

6) Live beyond a 30 km radius of the school.

Feeder Schools
Bryanston Primary School

Bryandale Primary School 

Bryneven Primay School 

Bryanston Parallel Medium School 

Rivonia Primary School 

Montrose Primary School

Academics
The academic subjects being offered each year include

Grade 8–9
 Afrikaans
 Art
 Drama
 English
 Economic management science
French
 Geography
 History
 Life Orientation
 Mathematics
 Physical education
 Natural sciences
 Technology
Zulu

Grade 10–12
 Afrikaans
 Art
 Accounting
 Business studies
 Drama
 Computer Application Technology (CAT)
 Information Technology (IT)
 Engineering Graphic Design
 English
French
 Geography
 History
 Life Orientation
 Physical Education
 Life Sciences
 Mathematics Core
 Mathematics Literacy
 Tourism
Zulu

Extra subjects (after & before school)

Extra Subjects at Bryanston include

 Advanced Practice Mathematics
 Advanced Practice English

Extracurricular activities
Extracurricular activities at Bryanston High School include many different Seasonal Sports and Cultural Activities.

Summer sports
Summer Sports include

 Swimming
 Water polo
 Cricket
 Volleyball
 Tennis
 Track and field

Winter sport
Winter Sport include

 Athletics
 Cross country
 Hockey
 Netball
 Rugby

Cultural
Cultural activities include

 Public speaking|
 Dance
 Major Production
 Photography
 Back Stage
 Sound and Lighting

Rivals of the school include

 Hyde Park High School
 FourwaysHigh School

Notable alumni
 Elon Musk (transferred to Pretoria Boys High School after bullying)
 Janine Botbyl Miss South Africa 1988
 Lorna Potgieter Miss South Africa 1984
 Diana Tilden-Davis Miss South Africa 1991

References

External links
 Bryanston High School official website

Schools in Johannesburg
Educational institutions established in 1968
1968 establishments in South Africa